Nils Butzen (born 2 April 1993) is a German professional footballer who plays as a right back or right midfielder for FSV Zwickau in the 3. Liga.

Career
Butzen was born in Mühlhausen in Thuringia. He started playing youth football at Union Mühlhausen before joining the youth department of 1. FC Magdeburg in 2009. He played three matches in the club's reserve team in the NOFV-Oberliga Süd in 2011, before becoming part of the first team squad for the 2011–12 season. He made his first team debut on 24 August 2011 in a Saxony-Anhalt Cup match, but had to wait until March next year for his league debut against Berliner AK. In the following years, Butzen established himself as a first team regular on the rightback position and saw his contract extended until June 2016 eventually.

Butzen played in 22 of 30 league matches in Magdeburg's successful 2014–15 campaign and scored his first two goals for the club against Carl Zeiss Jena in May. Following the club's promotion to Germany's 3. Liga, he made his professional debut as a rightback in Magdeburg's 2–1 victory over Rot-Weiß Erfurt in the season opener of the 2015–16 3. Liga season.

Honours

Club
1. FC Magdeburg
 Regionalliga Nordost: 2015
 Dritte Liga: 2018

References

External links
 

1993 births
Living people
People from Mühlhausen
Footballers from Thuringia
Association football defenders
German footballers
1. FC Magdeburg players
FC Hansa Rostock players
FSV Zwickau players
3. Liga players
2. Bundesliga players